Plainview is an unincorporated community in Morgan County, Georgia, United States, located approximately three miles from Madison.

History 
Plainview has historically been a farming community. Plainview contains Plainview Baptist Church and Plainview Baptist Church Cemetery.

In 1930 and 1934 respectively, artist Benny Andrews and writer Raymond Andrews were born in Plainview.

In 1966, Sports Illustrated published an article about the introduction of football to Plainview.

In 1979, the Supreme Court of Georgia the upheld the conviction of a person convicted of the murder and armed robbery of John Garrison, who was a grocery store operator in Plainview.

Notable people 

 Benny Andrews (1930–2006), painter and printmaker
 Raymond Andrews (1934–1991), novelist

References 

Unincorporated communities in Morgan County, Georgia
Unincorporated communities in Georgia (U.S. state)